The Preston Mosque, officially the Umar bin Al-Khattab Mosque, is a Sunni Islam mosque located in , a suburb of Melbourne, in Victoria, Australia.

The mosque is run by the (co-located) Islamic Society of Victoria Inc (ISV) and, between 2007 and 2011, was the seat of the late Muslim cleric, Sheik Fehmi Naji El-Imam, who was appointed as Grand Mufti of Australia.

History
Before the mosque was built, Muslims would gather at a house that used to be on the property. In 1975 the building began and was completed the following year in 1976. The dome and minaret were added later. Most of it was funded by Bosnian and Arab immigrants.

Background
About 800 people pass through the mosque per day over the course of the five daily prayers. For the Friday Congregational Prayer, at least 1000 worshipers will attend, and if the Friday falls on a public holiday that number can easily climb to 1500 worshipers.

Memorandum of Understanding
In 2009, the Darebin City Council signed a Memorandum of Understanding with the Islamic Society of Victoria (ISV). This was the first of its kind in Australia between a mosque and council, and has resulted in a strong and robust relationship between Council and mosque. The focus of the memorandum is that the council and mosque will work together on projects that have benefit to the community.  The City of Darebin is home to people from 148 different countries, who speak 105 different languages.

Mosque personnel
After Sheikh Fehmi Naji El Imam died on 24 September 2016, the Sheikh for the Preston Mosque was Mohamad Mahmoud Abou Eid, until he was terminated.

Services

 Five daily prayers and Friday Congregational Prayers
 Taraweeh (Night) Prayers during Ramadan
 Eid Prayers
 Burial service
 Mosque tours for schools and community groups
 Annual Hajj group
 Bookstore that has a range of authentic books and DVDs in Arabic and English
 An authorised marriage celebrant to officiate marriages
 Qurban / Udhiyah leading up to Eid al-Adha 
 International Well projects
 International orphan sponsorship
 Evening Islamic classes
 Female-only classes (during the day)
 Weekend Arabic School

Controversies
In the 1990s Islamist supporters of radical cleric Mohammed Omran engineered an election and amended the Preston mosque's constitution while the imam, Sheikh Fehmi el-Naji, was on the Hadj to Mecca. Supporters of Sheikh Fehmi worked hard over the next decade to regain ground, and by 2005 were claiming that they had achieved an uneasy balance within the congregation.

In 2012, a Preston mosque committee member advised wives to "fulfil the rights" of their husbands, by sharing him with other women. It was reported that this proposal outraged the local Muslim women.

In early 2017, police were called to the mosque following a serious altercation between factions.  It was reported the conflict was over financial irregularities at the mosque. Sheikh Mohamad Mahmoud Abou Eid was suspended.

See also

 Australian National Imams Council
 Criticism of Islam
 Gender segregation and Muslims
 Holsworthy Barracks terror plot
 Islam in Australia
 Islamic organisations in Australia
 List of mosques in Oceania

References

External links

 Preston Mosque 
 Preston Mosque on Facebook
  Islamic Society of Victoria

Mosques in Melbourne
Mosques completed in 1976
1976 establishments in Australia
Buildings and structures in the City of Darebin